Arney is a civil parish located in the barony of Clanawley and Tirkennedy in County Fermanagh, Northern Ireland. It is located in the Roman Catholic Diocese of Clogher.

History
The parish of Arney was historically known as the parish of Cleenish.

Area
The parish has a total area of 134.2 km² / 33,164.3 acres / 51.8 square miles.

References